Eomer may refer to:
a legendary king of the Angles (?-489 AD), see Eomer of Anglia
a character in The Lord of the Rings, see Éomer